Léonie Périault (born 31 July 1994) is a French triathlete. She finished 5th in the women's triathlon at the 2020 Summer Olympics in Tokyo. She subsequently won a bronze medal in the mixed triathlon relay event on 31 July 2021.

Périault grew up in Vélizy, Yvelines, France. She enjoyed swimming and mountain biking as a child and says she took part in her first triathlon when she was 8 years old.

References

Living people
1994 births
French female triathletes
Olympic triathletes of France
Place of birth missing (living people)
Triathletes at the 2020 Summer Olympics
Medalists at the 2020 Summer Olympics
Olympic bronze medalists for France
Olympic medalists in triathlon